In the area of conflict of laws, an anti-suit injunction is an order issued by a court or arbitral tribunal that prevents an opposing party from commencing or continuing a proceeding in another jurisdiction or forum. If the opposing party contravenes such an order issued by a court, a contempt of court order may be issued by the domestic court against that party.

It is often used as a means to prevent forum shopping. In recent years many jurisdictions have placed a high standard to obtain an injunction such as where the proceedings are "oppressive or vexatious". Furthermore, in proceedings up until the milestone decision in Gazprom case, anti-suit injunction was considered inapplicable in litigation or arbitration among EU member states. The question was whether it applied to arbitration, being excluded from the Brussels Convention. This was resolved in Gazprom case and the specifics of the exclusion were covered in recital 12 of Brussels recast, therefore current position is that anti-suit injunction can be issued by EU arbitration tribunals and upheld by Courts of Justice of EU member states.

See also
 Non-suit

References

Conflict of laws
Civil procedure
Venue (law)